Pye Corner Audio is a British electronic music project by Martin Jenkins. Originally self-released, Vols 1–2 and Vols 3–4 of the Black Mill Tapes were released by Type records. Sleep Games (2012) was released on Ghost Box.

As Pye Corner Audio, Jenkins has supported the Scottish band Mogwai and contributed a remix to their 2014 EP Music Industry 3. Fitness Industry 1.

Discography

Studio albums
 Black Mill Tapes Vol.1: Avant Shards (2010)
 Black Mill Tapes Vol.2: Do You Synthesize? (2011)
 Black Mill Tapes Vol.3: All Pathways Open (2012)
 Sleep Games (2012, Ghost Box)
 Black Mill Tapes Vol.4: Dystopian Vectors (2013)
 Prowler (2015, More Than Human)
 Stasis (2016, Ghost Box)
 Where Things Are Hollow (2017, Lapsus Records)
 Hollow Earth (2019, Ghost Box)
 Entangled Routes (2021, Ghost Box)
 Let’s Emerge! (2022, Sonic Cathedral)

Compilations and reissues
 Black Mill Tapes Vols.1 & 2 (2012, Type records)
 Black Mill Tapes Vols.3 & 4 (2014, Type records)

References

External links
Pye Corner Audio at Discogs.com

British electronic musicians
Ghost Box Music artists
Living people
Year of birth missing (living people)